Miles Smith (born September 24, 1984 in St. Louis, Missouri) is an American professional sprinter. By finishing sixth at the 2005 USATF Outdoor Championships in the 400m, he was selected to represent the United States at the 2005 World Championships in Athletics in the 4x400 m, where he won a gold medal by virtue of running in the preliminary rounds.

Despite an unspectacular high school career, Smith was able to achieve success as a collegiate and professional athlete. His coach Joey Haines once said, "Miles thinks he's the best in the world. He thinks he can do anything."

In 2013, Smith began coaching sprinters at Southeast Missouri State University.

Major international competitions

Domestic competitions

External links 
 Former Redhawk Prepares for Olympics

References 

Living people
1984 births
American male sprinters
Southeast Missouri State Redhawks track and field
World Athletics Championships winners